Craspedoporus elegans is an extinct marine species of diatom from a deposit from Oamaru, Otago, New Zealand.

References 

Bacillariophyceae
Enigmatic algae taxa
Enigmatic bikont taxa
Fossil algae
Biota of New Zealand
Fossils of New Zealand
Fossil taxa described in 1886